Cathy Cox may refer to:

 Cathy Cox (American politician)
 Cathy Cox (Canadian politician)

See also
 Catherine Cox (disambiguation)
 Kathy Cox (disambiguation)